Chen Jinn-lih is a Taiwanese politician. He was the first person of aboriginal descent to be appointed as Vice President of the Control Yuan.

Education
Chen obtained his master's degree in finance from National Chengchi University and doctoral degree in agriculture from Kyushu University in Japan.

Control Yuan

Typhoon Morakot
After Typhoon Morakot struck Taiwan in August 2009, Chen became the convener of the typhoon disaster investigations.

References

Taiwanese Members of the Control Yuan
Living people
National Chengchi University alumni
Academic staff of Kyushu University
Year of birth missing (living people)
Taiwanese politicians of indigenous descent